Cascade Canyon is located in Grand Teton National Park, in the U.S. state of Wyoming. The canyon was formed by glaciers which retreated at the end of the last glacial maximum approximately 15,000 years ago. Today, Cascade Canyon has numerous polished glacial erratics, hanging cirques and a U-shape as evidences that demonstrate that glaciers once filled the canyon to a depth of at least . Rock debris that was transported out of the canyon by glacial motion formed moraines which now impound the waters of Jenny Lake which is located at the base of the canyon.

The canyon is immediately west of Jenny Lake. The Cascade Canyon Trail follows the length of the canyon and is one of the most heavily used hiking trails in the park. The canyon can be reached from the Jenny Lake campground after a level hike of  along the Jenny Lake Trail, or by way of a scenic boat ride from the campground to the west shore of Jenny Lake. From there, hikers have the option of heading north along the Lake Solitude Trail to Lake Solitude (another  or south via the South Fork Cascade Canyon Trail to Hurricane Pass (. From Lake Solitude there are sweeping views of the Cathedral Group and Grand Teton. Just below Hurricane Pass, a small glacier known as Schoolroom Glacier can be reached via a short side trail. Steep cliffs descending from these peaks ensure that the high points to the north and south are not visible until one hikes considerable distance into the canyon.

Five miles (8 km) west of Jenny Lake the Cascade Canyon Barn is preserved. Built in 1935 by members of the Civilian Conservation Corps, the barn was placed on the National Register of Historic Places in 1998.

See also
Canyons of the Teton Range
Geology of the Grand Teton area

References

Canyons and gorges of Grand Teton National Park